Kaufman County is a county in the northeast area of the U.S. state of Texas. As of the 2020 census, its population was 145,310. Its county seat is Kaufman. Both the county, established in 1848, and the city were named for David S. Kaufman, a U.S. Representative and diplomat from Texas. Kaufman County is part of the Dallas-Fort Worth-Arlington metropolitan statistical area.

Western artist Frank Reaugh moved from Illinois to Kaufman County in 1876. There he was directly inspired for such paintings as The Approaching Herd (1902).

Geography
Located in the northeast portion of Texas, it is bounded on the southwest by the Trinity River, and drained by the east fork of that stream.

Major highways
  Interstate 20
  U.S. Highway 80
  U.S. Highway 175
  State Highway 34
  State Highway 205
  State Highway 243
  State Highway 274
  Spur 557

Adjacent counties
 Hunt County (north)
 Van Zandt County (east)
 Henderson County (south)
 Ellis County (southwest)
 Dallas County (west)
 Rockwall County (northwest)

Communities

Cities (multiple counties)

 Combine (partly in Dallas County)
 Dallas (mostly in Dallas County with small parts in Collin, Denton, Rockwall and Kaufman counties)
 Heath (mostly in Rockwall County)
 Mesquite (mostly in Dallas County)
 Poetry (partly in Hunt County)
 Seagoville (mostly in Dallas County)
 Seven Points (mostly in Henderson County)

Cities

 Cottonwood
 Crandall
 Forney
 Kaufman (county seat)
 Kemp
 Terrell

Towns

 Mabank (partly in Henderson County)
 Oak Grove
 Oak Ridge
 Post Oak Bend City
 Scurry
 Talty

Villages
 Grays Prairie
 Rosser

Census-designated places
 Elmo
 Heartland
 Travis Ranch

Unincorporated communities

 Ables Springs
 Abner
 Becker
 Cobb
 College Mound
 Colquitt
 Frog
 Gastonia
 Hiram
 Lawrence
 Lively
 Lone Star
 Markout
 McCoy
 Ola
 Prairieville
 Rand
 Tolosa
 Union Valley
 Warsaw
 Wilson

Ghost towns
 Cedar Grove
 Cedarvale
 Jiba
 Peeltown
 Stubbs
 Styx

Demographics

Note: the US Census treats Hispanic/Latino as an ethnic category. This table excludes Latinos from the racial categories and assigns them to a separate category. Hispanics/Latinos can be of any race.

According to the census of 2000, 71,313 people, 24,367 households, and 19,225 families were residing in the county. The population density was 91/sq mi (35/km2). Its 26,133 housing units averaged 33/sq mi (13/km2). In 2020, the population was 145,310. According to the 2000 census, the racial and ethnic makeup of the county was 81.10% White, 10.53% African American, 0.61% Native American, 0.47% Asian, 5.68% from other races, and 1.61% from two or more races. About 11.11% of the population was Hispanic or Latino of any race. By the 2020 census, its racial and ethnic makeup was 54.11% non-Hispanic white, 14.82% African American, 0.43% Native American, 1.45% Asian American, 0.05% Pacific Islander, 0.30% some other race, 3.95% multiracial, and 24.89% Hispanic or Latino American of any race.

Media
Kaufman County is part of the Dallas/Fort Worth DMA. Local media outlets include KDFW-TV, KXAS-TV, WFAA-TV, KTVT-TV, KERA-TV, KTXA-TV, KDFI-TV, KDAF-TV, KFWD-TV, and KDTX-TV. Other nearby stations that provide coverage for Kaufman County come from the Tyler/Longview/Jacksonville market and they include KLTV, KYTX-TV, KFXK-TV, and KETK-TV.

Kaufman County is served by three newspapers, the Terrell Tribune, the Kaufman Herald, and the Forney Messenger. Forney, Texas, is also served by online news media outlet inForney.com, which covers breaking news for the county. A quarterly magazine called Kaufman County Life is produced by the Terrell Tribune.  The Kemp and Mabank areas are included in coverage by The Monitor and Athens Daily Review newspapers.

Law enforcement
The Kaufman County Sheriff's Office is Kaufman County's main police force. Smaller cities depend on the sheriff's office, along with the Texas Highway Patrol, for law-enforcement duties.

Kaufman County murders

In December 2012, Texas officials issued a statewide bulletin warning that the Aryan Brotherhood was "actively planning retaliation against law enforcement officials" who worked to prosecute the gang's leadership.

In January 2013, Assistant District Attorney Mark Hasse of Kaufman County was assassinated by gunshot outside the Kaufman County courthouse. On March 30, 2013, District Attorney Mike McLelland, along with his wife, were found shot and killed in their home.  On April 13, 2013, ex-justice of the peace Eric Williams was arrested for making terrorist threats to county officials by email. Hasse and McLelland had aggressively prosecuted Williams in a theft case. Williams was convicted, and lost his position  and his law license as a result. On April 17, 2013, his wife Kim Williams was arrested on capital murder charges in all three deaths. 

Officials did not link these arrests or events to the Aryan Brotherhood.  Eric Williams was convicted at trial and sentenced to death on December 16, 2014.  Kim Williams pleaded guilty on December 30, 2014, and received a 40-year sentence.

Politics
Prior to 1952, Kaufman County was a Democratic Party stronghold in presidential elections. From 1952 to 1980, it was still primarily Democratic, though the party's margin of victories were far lower than before.  Republican Richard Nixon won the county handily in 1972 as part of his national landslide. Starting with the 1984 election, it has become a Republican stronghold, though neither of Bill Clinton's two Republican opponents managed a majority despite winning the county due to Ross Perot's strong third-party candidacy.

Education
School districts in the county include:
 Crandall Independent School District
 Forney Independent School District
 Kaufman Independent School District
 Kemp Independent School District
 Mabank Independent School District
 Quinlan Independent School District
 Rockwall Independent School District
 Scurry-Rosser Independent School District
 Terrell Independent School District
 Wills Point Independent School District

It is in the service area for Trinity Valley Community College.

See also

 List of museums in North Texas
 National Register of Historic Places listings in Kaufman County, Texas
 Recorded Texas Historic Landmarks in Kaufman County

References

Further reading
 Butler, Robert Richard  History of Kaufman County, Texas (M.A. thesis, University of Texas, 1940)
 Keller, Mabel Covington History of Kaufman County, Texas (M.A. thesis, North Texas State College, 1950)
 Clausen, C. A. ed., The Lady with the Pen: Elise Wærenskjold in Texas (Northfield, Minnesota: Norwegian-American Historical Association, 1961)

External links
 Kaufman County government's website
 Kaufman County at the Handbook of Texas Online

 
Dallas–Fort Worth metroplex
1848 establishments in Texas
Populated places established in 1848